Pyar Ki Jeet   (Love's Victory) is a 1948 Indian Bollywood film. It was the third highest grossing Indian film of 1948.

The film was directed by O. P. Dutta for Famous Pictures. It had music composed by Husnlal Bhagatram. The film starred Suraiya, Rehman, Gope, Raj Mehra, Manorama, Leela Mishra, Yashodhara Katju and Niranjan Sharma. ''Iss Dil ke Tukde Hazar hue, sung by Mohammed Rafi is still popular.

Cast
Suraiyaas the lead actress
Rehman as Hero
Gope as Comedian
Raj Mehra as Supporting actor
Manorama
Gyani
Leela Misra
Yashodhara Katju 
Niranjan Sharma as Supporting actor
Manmohan as Supporting actor

Soundtrack
The music was composed by Husnlal Bhagatram and the film song lyricists were Qamar Jalalabadi and Rajinder Krishan.

References

External links
 

1948 films
1940s Hindi-language films
Films scored by Husnlal Bhagatram
Indian black-and-white films
Indian drama films
1948 drama films
Hindi-language drama films